Neptune Oil Company was an Australian independent petroleum company based in Melbourne, Victoria.  The company was established in 1909 as a privately owned company.

The company was taken over by the Shell Oil company in 1975.

Distribution
In the Australian states, the usual practice was for storage and transport from the local main port, for distribution through the state, with the head offices in the capital city.

In many cases petrol stations with Neptune products were also dealing in second hand cars or other services.

A "King Neptune" statue at a Neptune (later Shell) service station was a landmark in the Adelaide suburb of Darlington until 1991. The King Neptune statue now resides at Wills street Birkenhead,inside the gates of the Shell fuel depot.

Publications
In the print era of the mid twentieth century, publications and promotions by the company were produced extensively in the 1950s and earlier 

Similarly, like Australia-wide oil retailers of the time, Neptune produced a series of road maps

References

Defunct oil and gas companies of Australia
Motor oils
Shell plc subsidiaries
Companies based in Melbourne
Energy companies established in 1909
Non-renewable resource companies established in 1909
Non-renewable resource companies disestablished in 1975
Australian companies established in 1909
1975 disestablishments in Australia
Privately held companies of Australia
Automotive fuel retailers in Australia